The Demons may refer to:

 Demons (Dostoevsky novel), an 1872 novel by Russian Fyodor Dostoevsky, also translated The Demons
 The Demons (1973 film), a French-Portuguese horror film directed by Jesús Franco
 The Demons (2015 film), a Canadian drama film directed by Philippe Lesage
 The Demons (audio drama), based on the television series Doctor Who
 The Dæmons, a Doctor Who serial first broadcast in 1971
 Melbourne Football Club, nicknamed the Demons

See also
Demon (disambiguation)